Florida Gardens light rail station is serviced by the Gold Coast light rail system known as the G:link. The station services the very southern end of Surfers Paradise, the Gold Coast's key tourist precinct. It appears to be in reference to Florida Gardens Estate, a former land development in the 1960s that extended west from Cascade Gardens and eventually evolved into Broadbeach Waters.

Location 
The station is located in the median strip of the Gold Coast Highway and provides access to local beaches, only a short walk away. Below is a map of the area surrounding the station.

References

External links 

 G:link

G:link stations
Railway stations in Australia opened in 2014
Surfers Paradise, Queensland